Helmut Kasimier (17 October 1926 in Breslau – 16 April 2013 in Hannover) was a German politician, representative of the Social Democratic Party. Kasimier was a Member of Parliament (the Landtag) of Lower Saxony from 1963 to 1986, during which he was the Chairman of the SDP faction in the parliament from 1967 to 1974 and Finance Minister of Lower Saxony from 1974 to 1976.

See also
List of Social Democratic Party of Germany politicians

References

Members of the Landtag of Lower Saxony
1926 births
2013 deaths
Politicians from Wrocław
People from the Province of Lower Silesia
Ministers of the Lower Saxony State Government